Çağdaş is a unisex Turkish given name.. People named Çağdaş include:

 Çağdaş Atan, Turkish footballer

See also
 Çağdaş, Lice
 Çağdaş Yaşamı Destekleme Derneği, a Turkish non-government organization
 Çankaya Çağdaş Sanatlar Merkezi Concert Hall

Turkish masculine given names